The 1975–76 New York Islanders season was the fourth season for the franchise in the National Hockey League.

Offseason

Regular season

Final standings

Schedule and results

Playoffs

The Islanders continued to show growth in the playoffs defeating the Vancouver Canucks in the preliminary round and the favored Buffalo Sabres in 6 games in the second round. The Islanders fell to the vastly superior Montreal Canadiens team that won 58 games that year and only lost one time in the entire playoffs. That one time was in Game 4 of the Semi-Finals, when they fell to the Islanders 5–2. The playoff run was generally viewed as a success since the Islanders had won 2 playoff series, and lost to the eventual champions. Additionally, the Isles still possessed a young core with players whom were still improving.

Round 1 vs. Vancouver

Round 2 vs. Buffalo

Round 3 vs. Montreal

Player statistics

Note: Pos = Position; GP = Games played; G = Goals; A = Assists; Pts = Points; +/- = plus/minus; PIM = Penalty minutes; PPG = Power-play goals; SHG = Short-handed goals; GWG = Game-winning goals
      MIN = Minutes played; W = Wins; L = Losses; T = Ties; GA = Goals-against; GAA = Goals-against average; SO = Shutouts;

Awards and records

Transactions

Draft picks
Below are the selections of the 1975 NHL Amateur Draft:

Farm teams

See also
 1975–76 NHL season

References

External links

New York Islanders seasons
New York Islanders
New York Islanders
New York Islanders
New York Islanders